The Netherlands Armed Forces are the military services of the Kingdom of the Netherlands. The core of the armed forces consists of the four service branches: the Royal Netherlands Navy, the Royal Netherlands Army, the Royal Netherlands Air Force and the Royal Netherlands Marechaussee. The service branches are supplemented by various joint support organisations. In addition, local conscript forces exist on the Dutch Caribbean islands of Aruba (AruMil) and Curaçao (CurMil). These operate under the auspices of the Royal Netherlands Navy and the Netherlands Marine Corps. The armed forces are organisationally part of the Ministry of Defence.

The existence of, authority over, and tasks of the armed forces are determined in the constitution of the Netherlands. The Government, which consists of cabinet members led by the Prime Minister and the King, functions as the head of the armed forces. Although service members swear allegiance to the King of the Netherlands, the monarch does not hold the position of commander-in-chief.

The military ranks of the Netherlands armed forces are similar to those of fellow NATO member states and were established by Royal Decree. The highest-ranking officer in the Dutch military is the Chief of Defence, who is a four-star officer (NATO OF-9).

Foundation in law and purpose 
The Netherlands armed forces exist by declaration in the constitution of the Netherlands. Article 97 of this constitution determines that the armed forces exist
 to defend the Kingdom of the Netherlands and its interests in the world; and
 to protect and advance the international rule of law.

This means that the role and responsibility of the Dutch military in international stability and peacekeeping is constitutionally determined.

The same article of the constitution determines that supreme command of the Dutch military resides with the Government of the Netherlands. This has been the case since the constitution was changed in 1983; before then, supreme command of the armed forces of the Netherlands was held by the King of the Netherlands.

Overview

Organisation 

The existence of, authority over, and tasks of the armed forces are determined in the constitution of the Netherlands. The Government, which consists of cabinet members led by the Prime Minister and the King, functions as the head of the armed forces. Although service members swear allegiance to the King of the Netherlands, the monarch does not hold the position of commander-in-chief. Therefore, in practice, important decisions are made by Cabinet, while the Minister of Defence assumes political responsibility over the Ministry.

The Ministry of Defence is the government ministry which is responsible for formulating and executing defence policy. The ministry consists of the Minister, State Secretary, the Central Staff, the Netherlands Armed Forces and two independent support organisations. The Central Staff of the Ministry comprises several directorates responsible for executing policy, advising the Minister and State Secretary, and controlling the Defence organisation. The Central Staff is led by the highest civil servant of the defence organisation, the Secretary General. Moreover, the Central Staff incorporates the Defence Staff, which is the highest military organ under command of the Chief of Defence. The Chief of Defence is the military leader of the Netherlands Armed Forces and the most senior military adviser to the Minister of Defence. The Chief of Defence has command over the Armed Forces, the Netherlands Special Operations Command (NLD SOCOM) and the Defence Cyber Command. Several special executive organisations, including the Military Intelligence and Security Service and the office of the Inspector General, are incorporated into the Central Staff as well.

Personnel 
The Netherlands Armed Forces are a professional military, conscription in the Netherlands having been suspended in 1996 with the exception of Aruba and Curaçao. All military branches and specialties are open to female recruits. In October 2018 the Ministry of Defence announced that the submarine service will also accept female recruits for positions as officer, NCO and sailor.

The Dutch Ministry of Defence employs over 66,000 personnel, including both civilian and military personnel. The distribution of personnel in the Defence organisation, including the Armed Forces, on 1 July 2020 was as follows:

Ranks 

The Dutch military is part of the NATO militaries and therefore conforms to the structure of a NATO military. It also uses conforming rank structures.

Oath 
All Dutch military personnel, officers and enlisted personnel, are required to take an oath of allegiance. This oath is recorded in the law on General Military Personnel Regulations (Algemeen Militair Ambtenarenregelement) in Article 126a and states the following:

Translated in English:

"I swear (pledge) loyalty to the King, obedience to the law and submission to martial discipline. So help me God (That, I pledge)."

Unionised military 
Unlike many military organisations, Dutch military members are allowed to form and join unions.

There is a wide variety of unions, including unions exclusive to officers or particular service branches. Some of the larger unions include:
 (AFMP, General Federation of Military Personnel), which was recognized by the Dutch government in 1966. The AFMP is a member of the Federation of Dutch Trade Unions (FNV).
 (ACOM, General Christian Organisation for Military Personnel). The ACOM is a member of the Christian National Trade Union Federation (CNV).
 (GOV/MHB, United Officers Associations and Middle- and Seniorlevel Civilian Personnel)
 (VBM, Union for Defence Personnel).

Service branches

Royal Netherlands Navy 

The Royal Netherlands Navy is a modern naval force which consists of 24 commissioned ships and an additional number of support ships of various types. The Navy is commanded by the Commander of the Royal Netherlands Navy, an officer in the rank of Vice Admiral or Lieutenant General of the Marines, who reports directly to the Chief of Defence. In addition to being the commanding officer of the Royal Netherlands Navy, the  holds the position of Admiral Benelux.

The surface fleet of the Navy consist of frigates, amphibious warfare ships, patrol vessels, mine-countermeasure vessels and multiple auxiliary ships. All major surface vessels of the Royal Netherlands Navy are constructed at the Dutch shipyard Damen Schelde Naval Shipbuilding. This includes the technologically advanced air-defence frigates of the De Zeven Provinciën-class. Thales Nederland produces various types of high-end sensors and radars for the Dutch fleet.

The Royal Netherlands Navy Submarine Service was established in 1906 and is responsible for the operation of all Dutch submarines. As of 2021, the  operates four Walrus-class submarines and one submarine tender, HNLMS Mercuur. The Dutch submarines fulfill a considerable role within NATO as their small size and expeditionary capacities allow them to operate in waters that are off-limits to larger submarines. The Ministry of Defence initiated a replacement program in November 2014, replacements are planned to enter service in the late 2020s.

Netherlands Marine Corps 

The Netherlands Marine Corps is the Navy's naval infantry corps. The Corps consist of two battalion-sized Marince Combat Groups, various support units and the Netherlands Maritime Special Operations Forces. The Marines are specialised in amphibious, arctic and mountain warfare as well as special operations. The Corps operates a fleet of landing craft that can operate from one of the two Navy's amphibious transport docks.

Royal Netherlands Army 

The Royal Netherlands Army consists of regular Army personnel and the National Reserve Corps. The core fighting element of the Army consist of three combat brigades: 11 Airmobile Brigade, 13 Light Brigade and 43 Mechanised Brigade. All Army units, and their personnel, are divided into tradtitional organisation of arms, services and regiments. The Army's infantry regiments fulfil several distinct roles, these include air assault, armoured infantry, light infantry and special operations. Furthermore, the Army fields cavalry, artillery, engineering and medical regiments.

Royal Netherlands Air Force 

The Royal Netherlands Air Force is the military aviation branch of the Netherlands Armed Forces and is led by the Commander of the Royal Netherlands Air Force. The Air Force operates a diverse fleet of fixed-wing and rotary aircraft, in addition to operating and maintaining multiple airbases. Moreover, Air Force personnel contributes to the Joint Ground-based Air Defence Command by operating various air-defence systems while other units are dedicated to force protection. The Air Force operates modern fighter aircraft, such as the F-16 Fighting Falcon and F-35 Lightning II, tankers, transports, helicopters, unmanned aerial vehicles, and various types of training aircraft.

Royal Netherlands Marechaussee 

The Royal Netherlands Marechaussee is a gendarmerie force which performs both military and civilian police duties. In addition to the military police duties, the Marechaussee has a wide variety of duties and responsibilities. This includes guarding the national borders and airports, fighting illegal immigration and transnational crime and guarding the royal palaces.

The Marechaussee was established as one of the separate Armed Forces in 1998; before then the Marechaussee was organised as one of the arms within the Army.
While the Royal Netherlands Marechaussee operates under the jurisdiction of the Ministry of Defence, the branch often performs duties delegated by the Ministry of Justice and Security and the Ministry of the Interior and Kingdom Relations. Moreover, several brigades of the Marechaussee are permanently stationed in the Dutch Caribbean.

Contemporary campaigns 

Since the 1990s, the Dutch military has been involved in several military campaigns and peace-keeping missions, these include:
 Bosnian War
 Kosovo War
 International Security Assistance Force in Afghanistan leading the effort in Uruzgan Province.
 Multinational force in Iraq
 United Nations Multidimensional Integrated Stabilization Mission in Mali
 Combined Joint Task Force
 Resolute Support Mission

Afghanistan

Contribution to ISAF 

As part of Operation Enduring Freedom, the Netherlands deployed aircraft which were integrated in the European Participating Air Force (EPAF) in support of ground operations in Afghanistan. Additionally, Dutch naval frigates were tasked with policing the waters of the Middle East and Indian Ocean. Between 2001 and 2003, a reinforced army company was deployed to Afghanistan to provide support in maintaining public order and providing security in and around the capital Kabul. Furthermore, military assistance was provided to the Afghan National Army and local security forces. The troops were deployed under the command of NATO's International Security Assistance Force mission.

The Netherlands deployed further troops and helicopters to Afghanistan in 2006 as part of a new security operation in the south of the country. In mid-2006, Dutch special forces of the Korps Commandotroepen as part of the Deployment Task Force successfully deployed to Tarin Kowt to lay the ground for the increasing numbers of engineers who were due to build a base there. By August 2006 the Netherlands had deployed the majority of 1,400 troops to Uruzgan province in southern Afghanistan at Kamp Holland in Tarin Kowt (1,200) and Kamp Hadrian in Deh Rahwod (200). PzH 2000 self-propelled artillery pieces were deployed and used in combat for the first time. The Dutch forces operated under the command of the ISAF Task Force Uruzgan and were involved in some of the more intensive combat operations in southern Afghanistan, including Operation Medusa and the Battle of Chora. On 18 April 2008, on the second day of his command, the son of the Chief of Defence (Netherlands) general Peter van Uhm, Lieutenant Dennis van Uhm, was one of two servicemen killed by a road-side explosion. As of 1 September 2008, the Netherlands had a total of 1,770 troops in Afghanistan excluding special forces troops.

Between 2002 and 2021, Dutch military personnel worked successively in the Afghan provinces of Kabul, Baghlan, Kandahar, Uruzgan, Kunduz and Balkh, with the aim, among other things, to bring stability and to build up the security apparatus, the army and the police.
In total, 25 Dutch servicemen were killed in action during the deployment.

Resolute Support Mission 
From 2015 until 2021, approximately 160 Dutch troops of the Korps Commandotroepen, NLMARSOF and multiple conventional support elements were deployed to the city of Mazar-e-Sharif as part of NATO's Resolute Support Mission. Dutch troops co-operated with personnel of the German Kommando Spezialkräfte as part of the German-Dutch lead Special Operations Advisory Team (SOAT). The SOAT provided advice and assistance during operations of the Afghan police tactical unit, the Afghan Territorial Force-888 (ATF-888). The SOAT was granted authority to deploy in the entirety of Afghanistan in 2019. The operations ended with the withdrawal of all United States and allied troops from Afghanistan in 2021.

Iraq

Multinational force in Iraq 
A contingent of 1,345 Army and Marines Corps personnel, supported by Royal Netherlands Air Force helicopters, was deployed to Iraq in 2003, based at Camp Smitty near As Samawah (southern Iraq) with responsibility for the Muthanna Province, as part of the Multinational force in Iraq. On June 1, 2004, the Dutch government renewed their stay through 2005. The Netherlands removed its troops from Iraq in March 2005, leaving half a dozen liaison officers until late 2005. The Netherlands lost two soldiers in separate attacks.

Intervention against ISIL 

On 24 September 2014, the Dutch government announced its participation in the military campaign against ISIL, and sent six F-16 fighter jets to Iraq to bomb ISIL. Their motivations to join this war: ISIL's advance in Iraq and Syria, while displaying "unprecedented violence" and "perpetrating terrible crimes against population groups", formed "a direct threat for that region"; ISIL's advance in Iraq and Syria "causes instability at the borders of Europe" which threatens "our own [Dutch] safety". In January 2016, the Netherlands extended their bombings of ISIL to Syrian territory. By the end of July 2016 the Dutch Air Task Force flew more than 2100 missions and carried out over 1800 air strikes. At the end of the Dutch contribution to the Air Task Force, in December 2018, the Royal Netherlands Air Force had flown over 3000 missions and conducted approximately 2100 air strikes.

From 2015 until the spring of 2018, KCT and NLMARSOF special operations forces deployed advice and assist (A&A) teams to northern Iraq in cooperation with the Belgian Special Forces Group (SFG). During this deployment, they provided support to Kurdish Peshmerga and Iraqi Army forces before, during and after operations in the battle against ISIL, as part of the Combined Joint Task Force – Operation Inherent Resolve.

Counterpiracy 
As a maritime nation and birthplace of the earliest maritime law, the Netherlands have historically highly valued the mare liberum principle. Hence, the Dutch government decided to contribute a significant amount of naval assets to combating piracy off the coast of Somalia since its most recent surge starting in 2005. The Royal Netherlands Navy was an active contributor to NATO's Operation Allied Protector and Operation Ocean Shield, as well as to the European Union's Operation Atalanta. Ships partaking in these missions included De Zeven Provinciën-class frigates, landing platform docks HNLMS Rotterdam and HNLMS Johan de Witt, and submarines of the Walrus-class. Additionally, surface combatants permanently carried boarding teams of the Netherlands Marine Corps. These boarding parties were often composed of operators of the Netherlands Maritime Special Operations Forces (NLMARSOF). In addition, conventional marine units supply Vessel Protection Detachments (VPDs) which continue to guard Dutch merchant vessels during transits through piracy-prone waters as of 2021.

The Dutch naval forces were regularly engaged in combat. Firefights between the naval ships and Somali pirates have cost the lives of pirates on multiple occasions. During the Action of 5 April 2010, a boarding team of the Unit Interventie Mariniers liberated container ship MV Taipan after rappelling down from HNLMS Tromp's helicopter onto containers on the ship's deck under the cover of machine gun fire. The successful operation was filmed with a helmet camera, the video footage reached worldwide news media and gained millions of views on YouTube. Moreover, NLMARSOF frogmen have successfully conducted sabotage operations of pirates' motherships by clandestinely attaching explosives to the ships' bilge.

Mali 

Special forces of the Korps Commandotroepen were deployed to Mali since 2014 as part of the UN mission MINUSMA. The primary task of the Dutch forces was to gather intelligence on local Islamist and rebel groups and to protect the people of Mali against said groups. Since 2016, conventional detachments consisting of 11 Air Assault Brigade and 13 Light Brigade troops were part of the MINUSMA rotations as well. Additionally, the Dutch contribution consisted of a RNLAF AH-64 Apache and CH-47 Chinook detachment which provided the necessary air support and transport for the infantry units on the ground.

On 16 March 2015, a Dutch AH-64 Apache attack helicopter of the Dutch MINUSMA air detachment crashed during a firing exercise, killing the two pilots. On 6 July 2016, two servicemen of 11 Air Assault Brigade were killed during a mortar-firing exercise, while a third serviceman was severely wounded. The incident lead to the resignation of the minister of Defence Jeanine Hennis-Plasschaert and Chief of Defence General Tom Middendorp after a critical report by the Dutch Safety Board found that the safety standards were subpar. The Netherlands ended their sizable contribution to the peacekeeping mission in May 2019 to send additional troops to Afghanistan instead.

Central staff

References

External links 

 Official homepage of the Ministry of Defence
 Official homepage of the Royal Netherlands Air Force
 Official homepage of the Royal Netherlands Army
 Official homepage of the Royal Netherlands Navy
 Official homepage of the Royal Military Police

 
 
Netherlands